HD 39901 is an orange hued star located in the constellation Columba. It is also called HR 2069, which is the star's Bright Star Catalog designation. Eggen (1989) lists it as a member of the old disk population.

Despite the HR designation, the object has an apparent magnitude of 6.54, slightly past the limit for the naked eye visibility. As a result, it is barely visible to the unaided eye in the best conditions. Parallax measurements from the Gaia spacecraft place the object 639 light years away. At that distance, HD 39901's brightness is diminished by 0.33 magnitudes due to interstellar dust. It has an absolute magnitude of −0.03.

This is an evolved red giant star with a stellar classification of K3 III. It has a comparable mass to the Sun but has expanded to 21.9 times the latter's girth. It radiates 143 times the luminosity of the Sun from its photosphere at an effective temperature of 4,373 K. HD 39901 is slightly enriched in heavy elements with a metallicity 120% that of the Sun's.

References

K-type giants
Columba (constellation)
Durchmusterung objects
039901
027835
2069